The 1987 World Junior Curling Championships were held from March 15 to 21 at the Esquimalt Sports Centre Arena in Esquimalt, British Columbia, Canada. The tournament only consisted of a men's event.

Teams

Round robin

  Teams to playoffs
  Teams to tiebreaker

Tiebreaker

Playoffs

Final standings

Awards
 WJCC Sportsmanship Award:  Jonathan Mead

All-Star Team:
Skip:  Douglas Dryburgh
Third:  Jonathan Mead
Second:  Lindsay Clark
Lead:  Stefan Timan

References

External links

World Junior Curling Championships
Sports competitions in Victoria, British Columbia
International curling competitions hosted by Canada
March 1987 sports events in Canada
1987 in youth sport
1987 in Canadian curling
1987 in British Columbia
Curling in British Columbia